Andy Milder (born August 16, 1969) is an American actor.

Career

He has appeared in such films as Apollo 13, Armageddon, Rumor Has It…, Frost/Nixon, Transformers, and Domino. He was a series regular on Fame L.A. and Weeds, and appeared on such shows as Star Trek: Voyager, Star Trek: Deep Space Nine, The West Wing, Six Feet Under, Ugly Betty, Boston Legal, Parks and Recreation, Married... with Children, The Wonder Years, Private Practice, and Criminal Minds. Milder provided narration for Ballroom Bootcamp, 101 Most Starlicious Make-Overs, Wrecks to Riches, and Lost Gold of World War II. He provided the voice of Lightning Lad in the 2006 animated series Legion of Super Heroes and the film Lego DC Comics Super Heroes: Justice League: Cosmic Clash. From 2005 to 2009, he was a recurring cast member and later series regular on Weeds as Dean Hodes. Starting in 2011, he is a recurring cast member on the Disney Channel sitcom Austin & Ally as Lester Dawson. He also had an appearance on the show Royal Pains on the USA Network as well as Rizzoli & Isles on TNT.

Personal life
Milder was born in Omaha, Nebraska. He moved to Santa Monica, California, at a young age and then went to the University of California, Berkeley, majoring in Economics before studying at the American Conservatory Theater in San Francisco. Milder lives in Manhattan Beach, California, with his wife, Dr. Betty Lee.

Filmography

References

External links
 (management agency's scene videos only)

Milder's "fake acting class"

1969 births
Living people
Actors from Manhattan Beach, California
American male film actors
American male television actors
American male voice actors
Male actors from Omaha, Nebraska
Male actors from Santa Monica, California
University of California, Berkeley alumni